Aarav Singh is an Indian television actor. He is known for his role of ACP Sameer Rane in Pavitra Rishta. He also played a negative lead on Colors Thoda Hai Bas Thode Ki Zaroorat Hai.

Personal life
He was born on 7 April 1988 into a Gujjar family of Rajasthan (Jaipur, India). He is married to Neha Choudhary in February 2020.

Television 
Aarav made his acting debut with the negative lead role of Thoda Hai Bas Thode Ki Zaroorat Hai on Colors in 2010. 
Aarav played an ACP role in Pavitra Rishta on Zee Tv

References

External links
 Aarav Singh website

Male actors from Rajasthan
Indian male models
Indian male television actors
Living people
People from Jaipur
Male actors in Hindi television
Year of birth missing (living people)